Colonia Glacier (Spanish: Glaciar Colonia or Ventisquero Colonia) is a valley glacier located in the Northern Patagonian Ice Field, Chile. Colonia Glacier dams two lakes; Cachet II and Arco Lake. The ice dam containing the waters of Cachet II Lake fails regularly, which generates glacial lake outburst floods.

On March 31, 2012, for the second time that year, virtually all of the 200 million cubic meters of water in Lake Cachet II were lost in less than 24 hours as a result of perforations in the glacial wall, a consequence of rising temperatures driven by climate change. The lake has drained 11 times since 2008 and experts predict it will increase in frequency.

References

Glaciers of Aysén Region